Skipsfjorden is the southern arm of the Kamøyfjorden, a fjord on the eastern side of the island of Magerøya in Nordkapp Municipality in Troms og Finnmark county, Norway.

The mouth of the fjord spans between the Skipsfjordneset headland in the northwest and Selvågklubben peninsula in the southeast.

The small village of Skipsfjord lies along the north side of the bottom of the fjord, while the hamlets of Valan and Austerelva are situated on the south side. The Honningsvåg Airport is located on the southern shore of the fjord. The town of Honningsvåg lies a little ways south of the fjord. The European route E69 highway runs along the southern side of the bay.

See also
 List of Norwegian fjords

References

Fjords of Troms og Finnmark
Magerøya
Nordkapp